Lakota is a town in south-central Ivory Coast. It is a sub-prefecture and the seat of Lakota Department in Lôh-Djiboua Region, Gôh-Djiboua District. Lakota is also a commune.

In 2021, the population of the sub-prefecture of Lakota was 169,330.

Villages
The 51 villages of the sub-prefecture of Lakota and their population in 2014 are:

Notes

Sub-prefectures of Lôh-Djiboua
Communes of Lôh-Djiboua